Franz Aschenwald (11 January 1913 – 31 January 1945) was an Austrian ski jumper. He competed in the individual event at the 1936 Winter Olympics.

References

External links
 

1913 births
1945 deaths
Austrian male ski jumpers
Olympic ski jumpers of Austria
Ski jumpers at the 1936 Winter Olympics
Sportspeople from Tyrol (state)
Austrian military personnel killed in World War II
20th-century Austrian people